Peter Barry (10 August 1928 – 26 August 2016) was an Irish Fine Gael politician who served as Tánaiste from January 1987 to March 1987, Deputy Leader of Fine Gael from 1977 to 1987 and 1991 to 1993, Minister for Foreign Affairs from 1982 to 1987, Minister for the Environment from 1982 to 1981, Minister for Education from 1976 to 1977, Minister for Transport and Power from 1973 to 1976 and Lord Mayor of Cork from 1970 to 1971. He served as a Teachta Dála (TD) from 1969 to 1997.

Early life and education
Barry was born in Blackrock, Cork, in 1928. He was the son of Anthony Barry, a Fine Gael TD and well-known businessman. He was educated at Christian Brothers College, Cork and then became the major shareholder in the family company, Barry's Tea.

Political career
He was first elected to Dáil Éireann as a Fine Gael TD for the Cork City South-East constituency at the 1969 general election. He would go on to win a Dáil seat at eight successive further general elections, changing constituency to Cork City in 1977 and Cork South-Central in 1981. When Fine Gael came to power following the 1973 general election, he was appointed Minister for Transport and Power. In 1976, he became Minister for Education. In 1979, after Garret FitzGerald had become leader of Fine Gael, Barry was elected deputy leader. From June 1981 to March 1982, he served as Minister for the Environment.

From December 1982 to 1987, he was Minister for Foreign Affairs. In this capacity he was heavily involved in the negotiations which resulted in the 1985 Anglo-Irish Agreement. He also became the first joint chairman of the Anglo-Irish Inter-Governmental Conference, established under the Agreement by the Irish and British governments. Following the Labour Party's withdrawal from the coalition government in 1987, Barry became Tánaiste, for a brief period. He was the first member of Fine Gael to hold the office of Tánaiste.

When FitzGerald resigned as Fine Gael leader after the 1987 general election, Barry was one of three candidates (along with Alan Dukes and John Bruton) who contested the party leadership. Dukes was the eventual victor.

He retired at the 1997 general election, at which his seat was held for Fine Gael by his daughter Deirdre Clune. She later served as a Senator representing the Cultural and Educational Panel, but resigned in 2014, on being elected as a Member of the European Parliament for Ireland South.

1986 Northern Ireland by-elections

In 1986, the fifteen Unionist members of the House of Commons in Westminster resigned in protest at the Anglo-Irish Agreement, causing by-elections. To ensure contests in each constituency, Wesley Robert Williamson changed his name by deed poll to Peter Barry, deliberately taking the name of the Irish Minister held responsible for the negotiations, and stood in the four constituencies, North Antrim, South Antrim, East Londonderry and Strangford, under the label "For the Anglo-Irish Agreement". Despite not campaigning, he won over 6,000 votes.

Personal life
His sister, Terry Kelly, served as Mayor of Limerick from 1983 to 1984.

See also
Families in the Oireachtas

References

 

1928 births
2016 deaths
Ministers for Foreign Affairs (Ireland)
Local councillors in Cork (city)
Lord Mayors of Cork
People from Cork (city)
Tánaistí
Fine Gael TDs
Members of the 19th Dáil
Members of the 20th Dáil
Members of the 21st Dáil
Members of the 22nd Dáil
Members of the 23rd Dáil
Members of the 24th Dáil
Members of the 25th Dáil
Members of the 26th Dáil
Members of the 27th Dáil
Ministers for Education (Ireland)
Ministers for Transport (Ireland)
People educated at Skerry's College
Ministers for the Environment (Ireland)
People educated at Christian Brothers College, Cork